Petersberg is a municipality in the district of Fulda, in Hesse, Germany. It is situated 3 km east of Fulda.

References

Fulda (district)